Gandzak may refer to several places:

 Gandzak, Armenia, a village in Armenia
 The old Armenian name for Ganja, Azerbaijan
 An alternative spelling of Ganzak, Iran